Curling at the 2020 Winter Youth Olympics took place at the Palladium de Champéry in Champéry, Switzerland from 10 to 22 January 2020.

The curling competition has been expanded, to allow for a further eight mixed teams to qualify, meaning a total of 96 curlers from 24 nations qualified to compete.

Medal summary

Medal table

Events

Qualification
A total of 24 countries qualified based on their placement points from various events. At the end of the qualification period, the top two North American, top three Asian and top eight European teams qualified, along with the top placed team from the Oceania and South America. Host nation Switzerland was also guaranteed a spot. The remaining eight teams were awarded alternating from the WCF Junior women's and men's rankings. A total of seven nations are scheduled to make their Winter Youth Olympics debut in the sport: Denmark, France, Hungary, Latvia, Poland, Slovenia and Spain.

Qualification timeline

Qualification summary

Summary

References

External links

Results Book – Curling

 
Winter Youth Olympics
2020
2020 Winter Youth Olympics events
Youth Olympics